Sandra Lee Wirth (June 8, 1945 – March 11, 2006) was an American politician and businesswoman.

Born in Buffalo, New York, Wirth owned a real estate business. She represented her hometown of West Seneca, New York as the 9th District Erie County Legislator from 1991 to 1994.

From 1995 until her death in 2006, from cancer, Wirth served, in the New York State Assembly, as a Republican.

Notes

1945 births
2006 deaths
Politicians from Buffalo, New York
Businesspeople from Buffalo, New York
Women state legislators in New York (state)
County legislators in New York (state)
Members of the New York State Assembly
20th-century American politicians
20th-century American women politicians
20th-century American businesspeople
21st-century American women